Architect of this Church is the debut album of Hope&Social (formally known as Four Day Hombre).  The official release date is July 13, 2009 on iTunes and other digital stores, although it was made available on the band's website on June 3, 2009, where it is available as a digital release and on CD. In a similar fashion to Radiohead's In Rainbows album, it can be purchased for any price (although the CD has a minimum donation of £2.95 to cover postage and packaging).

Track listing 
"Living a Lie" – 2:06
"Stuck Like Glue" – 3:57
"Sunlight Hold Me" – 5:33
"Drink the Drink" – 3:32
"King of Spain" – 3:56
"Do What You Must" – 4:55
"In Hope" – 5:51
"Red Red Rose" – 5:23
"Looking for Answers" – 4:55
"San Francisco" – 6:16

References 

2009 debut albums